Zübeyde Sultan ("creamed body" or "prime"; 28 March 1728 – 4 June 1756) was an Ottoman princess, daughter of Sultan Ahmed III (reign 1703 – 1730) and his consort Musli Kadın. She was the half-sister of Sultans Mustafa III (reign 1757 – 1774) and Abdul Hamid I (reign 1774 – 1789) of the Ottoman Empire.

Life
Zübeyde Sultan was born on 28 or 29 March 1728. Her father was Sultan Ahmed III, and her mother was Emine Musli Kadın (called also Muslıhe, Muslu or Musalli). She had a full elder sister named Ayşe Sultan.

Her father having been dethroned in 1730, she grew up at the Old Palace but was able to live in comfort, as he had had the farmstead of Dilsiz Mehmed Ağa, situated near Edirne, and thus its incomes, allocated to her.
  
Her cousin Mahmud I had a yalı, or waterfront manse, built for her at the precincts of Eyüp in around August 1747.

On 6 January 1748, during Mahmud's reign, Zübeyde was married firstly to Süleyman Pasha, Beylerbey (governor – general) of Anatolia and Vizier, who, though, died soon after, some six months into the marriage. 
Thus, she was married secondly, within the year, on 6 January 1749, to Numan Pasha, kapıcılar kethüdası, or head of the Imperial Palace Guards, Sanjak-Bey (provincial governor) of Thessaloniki and Kavala, and Vizier. Her husband would go on to serve in various other provincial posts, while Zübeyde continued to live at her house in Edirne.

She had no know children. 

Turkish historian Mustafa Çağatay Uluçay describes the princess as a “philanthropist, protector of the poor, who read day and night”.

Death
Zübeyde Sultan died of natural causes at the age of twenty-eight, on 4 June 1756. She was entombed in the Imperial Ladies Mausoleum, located at Yeni Mosque, Istanbul.

Ancestry

References

Sources
 
 
 
 
 

1728 births
1756 deaths
18th-century Ottoman princesses